Kushan Weerakkody (born 4 January 1994) is a Sri Lankan cricketer. He made his List A debut for Mannar District in the 2016–17 Districts One Day Tournament on 25 March 2017.

References

External links
 

1994 births
Living people
Sri Lankan cricketers
Mannar District cricketers
Place of birth missing (living people)